Segni is a town in the Lepini Mountains in the Province of Rome, Italy.

Segni may also refer to:

People
 Saint Bruno (bishop of Segni) (c.1047–1123), bishop of Segni and abbot of Montecassino
 Lotario de' Conti di Segni (1160/1–1216)), Pope Innocent III 
 Segni (surname), Italian surname

Other uses
 Bishop of Segni
 Conti di Segni, a noble family of Italy
 Segni (tribe), an ancient Belgian tribe reported by Julius Caesar
Segni Pact, an Italian political party that formed around politician Mario Segni

See also
Conti, a surname, listing the Conti di Segni family